These are the official results of the Men's Pole Vault event at the 1987 IAAF World Championships in Rome, Italy. There were a total of 24 participating athletes, with two qualifying groups and the final held on Saturday September 5, 1987.

Medalists

Schedule
All times are Central European Time (UTC+1)

Abbreviations
All results shown are in metres

Records

Results

Qualifying round
Held on Thursday 1987-09-03

Final

See also
 1983 Men's World Championships Pole Vault (Helsinki)
 1984 Men's Olympic Pole Vault (Los Angeles)
 1986 Men's European Championships Pole Vault (Stuttgart)
 1988 Men's Olympic Pole Vault (Seoul)
 1990 Men's European Championships Pole Vault (Split)
 1991 Men's World Championships Pole Vault (Tokyo)
 1992 Men's Olympic Pole Vault (Barcelona)

References
 Results

P
Pole vault at the World Athletics Championships